The 1989 Prague Skate was held November 1989. Medals were awarded in the disciplines of men's singles, ladies' singles and pair skating.

Men

Ladies

Pairs

Ice dancing

References
Rude Pravo, 06.11.1989, Page 8

Prague Skate
Prague Skate